Santhi Nivasam may refer to:
 Santhi Nivasam (1960 film)
 Santhi Nivasam (1986 film)